The clade Anaspidea, commonly known as sea hares (Aplysia species and related genera), are medium-sized to very large opisthobranch gastropod molluscs with a soft internal shell made of protein. These are marine gastropod molluscs in the superfamilies Aplysioidea and Akeroidea.

The name derives from their rounded shape and from the two long rhinophores that project upward from their heads and that somewhat resemble the ears of a hare.

Taxonomy 
Many older textbooks and websites refer to this suborder as "Anaspidea". The original author Paul Henri Fischer described the taxon Anaspidea at unspecified rank above family. In 1925 Johannes Thiele established the taxon Anaspidea as a suborder.

2005 taxonomy 
Since the taxon Anaspidea was not based on an existing genus, this name is no longer available according to the rules of the ICZN. Anaspidea has been replaced in the new Taxonomy of the Gastropoda (Bouchet & Rocroi, 2005) by the clade Aplysiomorpha.

The scientific name for the order in which they used to be classified, the Anaspidea, is derived from the Greek for "without a shield" and refers to the lack of the characteristic head shield found in the cephalaspidean opisthobranchs. Many anaspideans have only a thin, internal and much-reduced shell with a small mantle cavity; some have no shell at all. All species have a radula and gizzard plates.

2010 taxonomy 
Jörger et al. (2010) have moved this taxon (named as Anaspidea) to Euopisthobranchia.

2017 taxonomy
The name "Aplysiomorpha" was preferred by Bouchet and Rocroi (2005) over "Anaspidea Fischer", 1883, but the authors now agree that there is a consistent usage for Anaspidea in the recent literature and that the older name must be preferred.

Description
Sea hares are mostly rather large, bulky creatures when adults. Juveniles are mainly unobserved on the shoreline.

Sea hares have soft bodies with an internal shell, and like all opisthobranch molluscs, they are hermaphroditic. Unlike many other gastropods, they are more or less bilaterally symmetrical in their external appearance. The foot has lateral projections, or "parapodia".

Life habits

Sea hares are herbivorous, and are typically found on seaweed in shallow water. Some young sea hares seemingly are capable of burrowing in soft sediment, leaving only their rhinophores and mantle opening showing. Sea hares have an extremely good sense of smell. They can follow even the faintest scent using their rhinophores, which are extremely sensitive chemoreceptors.

Their color corresponds with the color of the seaweed they eat: red sea hares have been feeding on red seaweed. This camouflages them from predators. When disturbed, a sea hare can release ink from its ink glands, providing a fluid, smoke-like toxic screen, adversely affecting its predators' olfactory senses while acting as a powerful deterrent. The toxic ink may be white, purple, or red, depending on the pigments in their seaweed food source and lightens in color as it spreads, diluted by seawater. Their skin contains a similar toxin that renders sea hares largely inedible to many predators.  In addition to the colored ink, sea hares can secrete a clear slime akin to that released defensively by hagfish which physically plugs the olfactory receptors of predators like lobsters.

Some sea hares can employ jet propulsion as a locomotion and others move like stingrays but with greater fluttering fluidity in their jelly-like "wings".  In the moving marine environment and without the sophisticated cognitive machinery of the cephalopods, their motion appears to be somewhat erratic, but they do reach their goals, such as the seabed, according to the wave-action, currents, or calmness of their area.

Human use
Sea hares are consumed in several parts of the world. An example may be "酱爆海兔" (jiàng bào hǎi tù), lit. "sauce-fried sea hare", a Chinese dish featuring sea hare and occasionally squid quickly fried in a sauce.
In Hawaii, sea hares, or kualakai,  are typically cooked in an imu wrapped in ti leaves.

Aplysia californica is a species of sea hare noteworthy for its use in studies of the neurobiology of learning and memory, due to its unusually large axons. It is especially associated with the work of Nobel Laureate Eric Kandel. Research surrounding the aplysia gill and siphon withdrawal reflex may be of particular interest with respect to this.

Reef aquaria
Sea hares are often used as a method of eradicating nuisance algae and cyanobacteria ("red slime algae") in reef aquaria. The hares usually do an excellent job, but when they have eaten all of the algae and cyanobacteria, they often shrink from starvation and eventually starve to death. Many reef-keeping clubs have started programs where groups of hobbyists "share" a single sea hare among a large group.

Gallery

References

External links 

 California Brown Sea Hare — Cabrillo Marine Aquarium
 Aplysiidae (sea slugs) of Hawaii

 
Taxa named by Paul Henri Fischer
Euopisthobranchia